Jermain Phydell Hollis (born 7 October 1986) is a footballer who played in the Football League for Kidderminster Harriers, and in non-league football for clubs including Eastwood Town, Alvechurch and Hucknall Town. He plays for Long Eaton United. Born in England, he played for the Jamaica U20 national team at international level.

Playing career
Hollis signed for Hednesford Town on 25 May 2018. On 17 November 2018, Hollis signed for Ilkeston Town.

International career
Hollis was born in Nottingham, England, but represented Jamaica at under-20 level. He played at the 2005 CONCACAF U-20 Tournament, which doubled as the qualifying process for the 2005 FIFA World Youth Championship, and at the 2006 Central American and Caribbean Games.

References

External links

1986 births
Living people
Footballers from Nottingham
English footballers
Jamaican footballers
Association football midfielders
Eastwood Town F.C. players
Kidderminster Harriers F.C. players
Alvechurch F.C. players
Hucknall Town F.C. players
Gresley F.C. players
Rainworth Miners Welfare F.C. players
Carlton Town F.C. players
Shepshed Dynamo F.C. players
Basford United F.C. players
Belper Town F.C. players
Grantham Town F.C. players
Long Eaton United F.C. players
Coalville Town F.C. players
Hednesford Town F.C. players
Ilkeston Town F.C. players
Eastwood C.F.C. players
Newark F.C. players
English Football League players
United Counties League players